Luiz Eduardo Amaral Serra Pereira or simply Luizinho (born March 19, 1987 in Rio de Janeiro), is a Brazilian defensive midfielder. He currently plays for F.C. Penafiel.

Contract
1 August 2004 to 31 August 2007

External links
 Conhecendo a prata-da-casa
 zerozero.pt
 globoesporte
 CBF

1987 births
Living people
Brazilian footballers
Fluminense FC players
F.C. Penafiel players
Association football midfielders
Footballers from Rio de Janeiro (city)